Alfred Lewis may refer to:

Alfred Baker Lewis (1897–1980), American lawyer, union organizer, socialist, and civil rights activist
Alfred E. Lewis (died 1994), Washington Post crime reporter
Alfred Henry Lewis (1855–1914), American investigative journalist, lawyer, novelist, editor, and short story writer

See also 
 Al Lewis (disambiguation)